Ramjar Gewog (Dzongkha: རམ་སྦྱར་) is a gewog (village block) of Trashiyangtse District, Bhutan.

References

Gewogs of Bhutan
Trashiyangtse District